Robert James Sharpe, FRSC (born December 4, 1945) is a Canadian lawyer, author, academic, and judge. He was dean of the University of Toronto Faculty of Law from 1990 to 1995 and a judge of the Court of Appeal for Ontario from 1999 to 2020.

Early life
Robert James Sharpe was born on December 4, 1945, in Brantford, Ontario, to Eleanor Jane (Cooper) and Ira Sutherland Sharpe. He received a Bachelor of Arts from the University of Western Ontario in 1966, a Bachelor of Laws from the University of Toronto in 1970, and a DPhil from the University of Oxford in 1974.

Legal career
He was called to the bar of Ontario in 1974 and practised law with the firm of MacKinnon, McTaggart (later McTaggart, Potts, Stone & Herridge) in the area of civil litigation. He taught at the University of Toronto Faculty of Law from 1976 to 1988. From 1988 to 1990, he was the Executive Legal Officer at the Supreme Court of Canada under Chief Justice Brian Dickson. From 1990 to 1995, he was the Dean of the University of Toronto Faculty of Law. In 1995, he was appointed to the Ontario Court of Justice (General Division) (now the Superior Court of Justice). In 1999, he was appointed to the Court of Appeal for Ontario. From 2011 to 2021, he was Visiting Professor at the University of Oxford. Sharpe retired from the judiciary on February 28, 2020.

After leaving the bench, he joined Arbitration Place and rejoined the University of Toronto Faculty of Law as Distinguished Jurist in Residence. He was President of the Canadian Institute for Advanced Legal Studies from 2014 to 2020, and is currently the President of the Osgoode Society for Legal History.

Selected works 

 The Law of Habeas Corpus (1976)
 Injunctions and Specific Performance (1983) (Canadian Bar Association’s Walter Owen Book Prize) (5th ed, 2017)
 Charter Litigation (1987) (Editor)
 The Last Day, The Last Hour: The Currie Libel Trial (1988) 
 The Charter of Rights and Freedoms (with Kent Roach) (7th ed 2021)
 Brian Dickson: A Judge’s Journey (with Kent Roach) (2003) (John Wesley Dafoe Prize)
 The Persons Case: The Origins and Legacy of the Fight for Legal Personhood (with Patricia McMahon) (2007) (Canadian Law and Society Book Prize)
 The Lazier Murder: Prince Edward County, 1884 (2011) (Ontario Historical Association Fred Landon Book Prize)
 Good Judgment: Making Judicial Decisions (2018)

Notable judgments 
In 2001, Robert Sharpe wrote the reasons of the Ontario Court of Appeal that recognized the distinctive legal rights of Métis people.

In November 2007, the Toronto Star reported that "In a decision [written by Justice Sharpe on behalf of a panel comprising himself and Justices Karen Weiler and Robert Blair] described as a major breakthrough for freedom of the press in Canada, the [Ontario Court of Appeal] chiselled out what it calls a "new and distinctive" defence for journalists reporting on matters of public significance.

In 2012, he wrote the Ontario Court of Appeal's decision that established the right to sue for invasion of privacy.

Honours and awards 
Sharpe was elected a fellow of the Royal Society of Canada in 1991. He was awarded the Ontario Bar Association Distinguished Service Award in 2005, and in 2008 he was awarded the Mundell Medal which celebrates excellence in legal writing by Ontario authors who have made a distinguished contribution to law and letters.

In 2021, he received honorary doctorate degrees from the Law Society of Ontario and the University of Windsor. And in 2020 he was recognized with a Distinguished Alumni Award from the University of Toronto Faculty of Law.

References

1945 births
Living people
Alumni of the University of Oxford
Canadian legal writers
Canadian university and college faculty deans
Fellows of the Royal Society of Canada
Justices of the Court of Appeal for Ontario
Judges in Ontario
Lawyers in Ontario
Writers from Brantford
Academic staff of the University of Toronto Faculty of Law
University of Western Ontario alumni
University of Toronto Faculty of Law alumni